Nikolsk is a rural locality (a village) in Verkhnetatyshlinsky Selsoviet, Tatyshlinsky District, Bashkortostan, Russia. The population was 25 as of 2010. There is 1 street.

Geography 
Nikolsk is located 4 km southwest of Verkhniye Tatyshly (the district's administrative centre) by road. Nizhniye Talyshly is the nearest rural locality.

References 

Rural localities in Tatyshlinsky District